This is a list of Tajik League winter transfers for the 2012 season, by club. Thirteen clubs participated. Shodmon Ghissar quit the league before the start of the competition.

Tajik League

Winter 2012 transfers

Istiqlol Dushanbe

In:

 
 
 

 

Out:

CSKA Pomir Dushanbe

In:

 
 
 
 

 

 
 

Out:

Energetik Dushanbe

In:

 

Out:

FK Khujand

In:

 
 
 
 

 

 

Out:

Guardia Dushanbe

In:

 
 
 

 

Out:

Khayr Vahdat FK

In:

 
 
 
 

 

 

Out:

Parvoz Bobojon Ghafurov

In:

 
 
 
 

 

 

Out:

Ravshan Kulob

In:

 
 
 
 

 

 

Out:

Regar-TadAZ Tursunzoda

In:

 
 
 
 

 

 

 

Out:

Vakhsh Qurghonteppa

In:

 

Out:

Istaravshan

In:

 
 
 
 

 

Out:

Khosilot Farkhor

In:

 

Out:

Zarafshon Pendjikent

In:

 
 
 
 

 

 

Out:

References 

 Football federation of Tadjikistan
 Чемпионат Таджикистана: итоги трансферного рынка межсезонья

Football in Tajikistan